The redeye labeo (Labeo cylindricus) is a species of fish in the cyprinid genus Labeo. It is a freshwater fish endemic to the rivers of East Africa, from the Zambezi through the Limpopo and Komati Rivers to the Pongola River. It also inhabits upper and middle parts of the Congo River.

Appearance
The body of the fish is cylindrical and it has a characteristic protruded snout, usually with star shaped tubercles on it. The mouth is large and the lips fleshy. The general colour is yellow-green with a darker band stretching horizontal over the body. Older fish is a darker olive grey. The eyes are typically red and the fish reaches 23 cm in length.

Habitat 
The species prefers clear, running waters in rocky habitats of small and large rivers, and is also found in lakes and dams over rocky areas. It feeds on diatoms and other small algae from the rocks. It migrates upstream in masses to breed, using the mouth and broad pectoral fins to climb damp surfaces of barrier rocks and weirs in the river.

References 

 

Labeo
Fish described in 1852
Taxa named by Wilhelm Peters